During the 1960–61 English football season, Sheffield Wednesday F.C. competed in the Football League First Division.

Season summary
In the 1960–61 season, the Owls had an excellent campaign, reaching the last eight of the FA Cup and finishing 2nd place in the league, 8 points behind champions Tottenham Hotspur.

Final league table

Results
Sheffield Wednesday's score comes first

Legend

Football League First Division

FA Cup

Squad
Source:

References

Sheffield Wednesday F.C. seasons
Sheffield Wednesday